() is a 1941 Indian Hindu mythological film, directed by Ellis R. Dungan and associate J. Moylan. The film stars Kothamangalam Subbu, Kothamangalam Seenu and K. R. Chellam. Co-starring were T. R. Rajakumari, M. S. Sundari Bai and S. R. Janaki.

Plot 
On a festival day, Sage Narada (Master Rajagopal) meets the Sun God, also known as Surya, (Kothamangalam Subbu) and sings praises of him. He is accosted by Thailakethu, The king of Yakshas (K. S. Gopalakrishnan), who does not like Narada praising the Sun God. He is upset and decides to teach Narada a lesson. Thapathi (K. R. Chellam) is the daughter of the Sun God, and she falls in love with King Samvaran (Kothamangalam Seenu), even without meeting him. The Yakshas King is in love with her. So, he tries to blackmail her into giving up the king. The King's first wife Sulochanan (T. R. Rajakumari) undertakes several sacrifices to save her husband. She also prays to the Sun God, and after being helped by Narada, the evil designs of the Yakshas King are destroyed. The King marries Thapathi and they all live happily thereafter.

Cast 
The list is adapted from the film's review article in The Hindu.

Male cast
 Kothamangalam Subbu as Sun God
 Master Rajagopal as Sage Narada
 K. S. Gopalakrishnan as Thailakethu King of Yakshas
 Kothamangalam Seenu as King Samvaran
 Papanasam Rajagopala Iyer

Female cast
 K. R. Chellam as River Thapathi
 T. R. Rajakumari as Queen Sulochana
 S. R. Janaki
 M. S. Sundari Bai
 V. Subbulakshmi

Production 
The script was written by K. S. Gopalakrishnan and the dialogues were penned by Kothamangalam Subbu. Sailen Bose and Kamal Ghose handled the Camera. The film was made at MPPC Studios that was owned by K. Subramanyam. (Later, S. S. Vasan bought this studio and renamed it as Gemini Studios).

Soundtrack 
Music was composed by V. S. Parthasarathi Ayyangar while the lyrics were written by the Papanasam brothers – Papanasam Sivan and Papanasam Rajagopala Iyer.

Reception 
Despite director Ellis R. Dungan's impressive camera work, the film did not do well at the box office. Film historian Randor Guy, writing in 2013, said the film is "Remembered for the deft direction of Dungan, and the impressive lens work of Sailen Bose and Kamal Ghosh...

Notes

References 

1941 films
1940s Tamil-language films
Indian black-and-white films
Hindu mythological films
Hindu devotional films
Films about Hinduism
Indian films based on actual events
Indian epic films
Religious epic films
Indian biographical films
Indian musical films
Films directed by Ellis R. Dungan
1941 musical films
1940s biographical films